Mamari Djime Ngakinar is a Chad politician and Colonel who served as 1st Vice President of Chad from April 1975 to August 1978.

References 

Vice presidents of Chad